Aloysia fiebrigii is a species in the genus Aloysia in the family Verbenaceae. It is native to high elevation in the Andes of Bolivia.

Aloysia fiebrigii is distinguished by whorled, arcuate leves, short spikes (7–17 mm long), short calyces 1.2-1.6 mm long, and bractlets approximately the same length as the calyx. The calyces are densely glandular and minutely strigose.

References

fiebrigii
Flora of Bolivia